Sauntry is an unincorporated community located in the town of Solon Springs, Douglas County, Wisconsin, United States.

History
The community was named for C. S. Sauntry, a businessperson in the lumber industry.

Notes

Unincorporated communities in Douglas County, Wisconsin
Unincorporated communities in Wisconsin